Materia is Latin for "material", and may refer to:

Science, philosophy and medicine 
Matter as described by conventional physics and chemistry
Matter (philosophy) as contemplated by metaphysical philosophy
 Prima Materia is, according to alchemists, the alleged primitive formless base of all matter
 Materia medica, a Latin medical term for the body of collected knowledge about the therapeutic properties of any substance used for healing (i.e., medicines)
 Homeopathic Materia Medica

Technology 
 Materials used in manufacturing
Daihatsu Materia, a Japanese automobile

Music 
Grand Materia, released in 2005, was the ninth studio album by Swedish heavy metal band Morgana Lefay
Materia (Novembre album), a 2006 album by the Italian metal band Novembre
 Memento Materia, a Swedish record label focusing on synth-, electro- and futurepop, although it also released some EBM in the 1990s

Games and software 
 Materia (Final Fantasy), part of the Final Fantasy VII video game mythos

See also
 Marteria, German electronic/rap artist